No Shame may refer to:

No Shame Theatre, a theatrical "open mic" event
No Shame (film), a 2001 Spanish film
No Shame, No Fear, a 2003 novel by Ann Turnbull
No Shame (Pepper album), 2006
No Shame (Sarah De Bono album), 2012
No Shame (Hopsin album), 2017
No Shame (Lily Allen album), 2018
"No Shame" (Sarah De Bono song), 2012
"No Shame" (5 Seconds of Summer song), 2020

See also
Shame (disambiguation)